The Men's 4 × 100 metre freestyle relay competition of the swimming events at the 2015 World Aquatics Championships was held on 2 August with the heats and the final.

Records
Prior to the competition, the existing world and championship records were as follows.

Results

Heats
The heats were held at 12:10.

Final
The final was held at 19:03.

References

Men's 4 x 100 metre freestyle relay